Asclepias curassavica, commonly known as tropical milkweed, is a flowering plant species of the milkweed genus, Asclepias. It is native to the American tropics and has a pantropical distribution as an introduced species. Other common names include bloodflower or blood flower, cotton bush, hierba de la cucaracha, Mexican butterfly weed, redhead, scarlet milkweed, and wild ipecacuanha.

It is grown as an ornamental garden plant and as a food source for some butterflies, however it may be harmful to the migration patterns of monarch butterflies when used in gardens outside of its native tropical range. Though public concern for the rapidly declining monarch population increased the demand and commercial availability of milkweed among nurseries in the US, the results have been mixed. While tropical milkweed may effectively sustain monarch larvae, the perennial growth of the plant takes ill effect on the monarchs' migratory patterns and may have other physiological effects. Use of the tropical milkweed in gardens has disrupted monarch migrations notably in California, Texas, Florida, and South Carolina. Unlike the milkweed species native to these locations, the tropical milkweed does not go dormant in the winter causing non-migratory groups of butterflies to form. Planting Asclepias curassavica in nonnative regions therefore remains controversial and criticized. Alternatively, native milkweed species (such as showy milkweed, narrowleaf milkweed, and desert milkweed for California) are suggested for butterfly gardens.

It also attracts members of the Danainae subfamily, such as the queen.

Description
The leaves are arranged oppositely on the stems and are lanceolate or oblong-lanceolate shaped ending in acuminate or acute tips. Like other members of the genus, the sap is milky. The flowers are in cymes with 10-20 flowers each. They have purple or red corollas and corona lobes that are yellow or orange. Flowering occurs nearly year-round. The flat seeds have silky hairs that allow the seeds to float on air currents when the pod-like follicles dehisce (split open).

Cultivation
There are a number of different cultivars with improved flower colors and shorter habit; some have bright red, yellow or orange colored flowers. Asclepias curassavica is sometimes used in butterfly gardens (see above for concerns for monarchs) or as a cut flower. However, when the stems or leaves are broken, a poisonous milky sap exudes which can cause eye injury.

Distribution
Asclepias curassavica is described by NatureServe as a "widespread species, ranging from southern North America through Central America and into South America."

It is an introduced species in the US states of California, Florida, Hawaii, Louisiana, Tennessee, and Texas, as well as the US unincorporated territories of Puerto Rico and the United States Virgin Islands.

It has been introduced and naturalized in the Chinese provinces of Anhui, Fujian, Guangdong, Guangxi, Guizhou, Hainan, Hubei, Hunan, Jiangsu, Jiangxi, Qinghai, Sichuan, Xizang, Yunnan, and Zhejiang, as well as in Taiwan.

Asclepias curassavica was introduced to Australia prior to 1869 and is widespread in parts of Queensland. It is considered an exotic plant, and a weed, at the Meteor Downs South Project near Rolleston, Queensland, Australia.

Chemistry
Asclepias curassavica contains several cardiac glycosides, including asclepin, calotropin, uzarin and their free genins, calactin, coroglucigenin and uzarigenin. It also contains oleanolic acid, β-sitosterol, and glycosides of asclepin. The most abundant cardiac glycoside present in Asclepias curassavica leaves is voruscharin, which comprises around 40% of the total cardiac glycoside content in leaves.

Gallery

References

External links

 Jepson Manual (1993)—description of introduced species and non-native California distribution

curassavica
Butterfly food plants
Flora of South America
Garden plants of South America
Pantropical flora
Plants described in 1753
Taxa named by Carl Linnaeus